Ekeby-Almby is a locality situated in Örebro Municipality, Örebro County, Sweden with 1,271 inhabitants in 2010. It's notable for being the birthplace of former Swedish Formula 1 driver Ronnie Peterson.

References 

Örebro
Populated places in Örebro Municipality